Dayenu is an LGBTQ+ organisation based in Sydney, Australia. The word Dayenu means "enough" in Hebrew, and the group uses it to mean that they have had "enough" of homophobia.

History 
The group Dayenu began as an idea in 1999 to create a gay and Jewish float for the 2000 Sydney Gay and Lesbian Mardi Gras. After the parade the group began in order to offer permanent resources for LGBTQ+ Jews in Sydney.

In 2013 Dayenu celebrated its bar mitzah as it turned 13 at the Sydney Gay and Lesbian Mardi Gras. The group celebrated by wearing pink kippot and rainbow tallit, as well as featuring a large glittery Star of David.

Goals 
The group's mission is to:
 Provide outreach and support;
 Deliver educational information and public representation; and,
 Organise social activities for Jewish gays and lesbians and their partners, friends and family.

Services and events

Religious services 
Dayenu hosts synagogue services and weekly Shabbat dinners, as well as an annual Passover Seder. Emanuel Synagogue in Sydney supports Dayenu and hosts many of their religious events.

Social events 
Dayenu hosts movie nights, bowling, dinners, and pub nights.

Mardi Gras 
Sydney has an annual Gay and Lesbian Mardi Gras in which Dayenu participates and has a float. The group has participated every year since the 2000 parade, except for 2006 when inactivity and lack of funds precluded the group's involvement. The group also has a large Shabbat dinner to celebrate the Mardi Gras.

Youth Services 
Dayenu is a parent organisation to the group Young Dayenu, which is a group of younger Jewish LGBTQ+ people.

References 

Jews and Judaism in Sydney
LGBT organisations in Australia
Organizations established in 2000
LGBT culture in Sydney
LGBT Jewish organizations